"Kiss My (Uh-Oh)" is a song by English singer Anne-Marie and British girl group Little Mix. It was released by Asylum Records, as the fourth single from Anne-Marie's second studio-album Therapy (2021). It was written by Anne Marie, Taylor Upsahl, Camille Purcell, Pete Nappi, and John Banfield, with production by Nappi and Mojam. An electropop and calypso-pop song which samples Lumidee's song "Never Leave You (Uh Oooh, Uh Oooh)", the song lyrically discusses the liberation someone feels after walking away from a toxic relationship. 

Kiss My (Uh-Oh) was met with mixed reviews from critics. On 26th August 2021, a remix of the song titled "Girl Power remix" was released featuring Becky Hill, Raye, and Stefflon Don. The remix helped the song reach a new peak of number ten in the UK, becoming Anne Marie's sixth and Little Mix's nineteenth top ten single in the UK. Kiss My (Uh-Oh) reached the top fifteen of the Irish Singles Chart and reached the charts in eight other music markets.

Composition
The song contains a sample of "Never Leave You (Uh Oooh, Uh Oooh)", a 2003 single by Lumidee.
"Kiss My (Uh-Oh)" is a "playful" calypso-pop and electropop song written by Anne-Marie, Taylor Upsahl, Kamille, Peter Nappi, and Jacob Banfield, with the production handled by Nappi and Mojam. The song runs for a total length of two minutes and 57 seconds. Robin Murray of Clash compared the song to the works of Beyoncé. According to the sheet music published at Musicnotes.com by Universal Music Publishing Group, the song is written in the key of F minor with a tempo of 104 beats per minute.

Critical reception
Robin Murray of Clash called the song a "blockbuster" and "a sly and subversive ode to the powers of womanhood". Michael Cragg of The Guardian referred to the song's sampling of "Never Leave You (Uh Oooh, Uh Oooh)" as "a lot of fun", but felt that Anne-Marie was "completely dominated by guests Little Mix and their not inconsiderable vocals".

It was featured as the commercial song in 2022 for BBC One series 4 of Glow Up.

Music video
The music video for the song, directed by Hannah Lux Davis, was released the same day as the single. It was Little Mix's second music video to be directed by Davis, with the first being their 2017 single "Power". Inspired by the 2011 comedy flim Bridesmaids, it features the group recreating select scenes from the film, as well as a scene with Anne-Marie and Jade Thirlwall in a club, while Perrie Edwards and Leigh-Anne Pinnock stay in a hotel room.

Track listing
Digital download and streaming
 "Kiss My (Uh-Oh)" – 2:57

Streaming – bonus tracks
 "Kiss My (Uh-Oh)" – 2:57
 "Our Song" – 2:43
 "Beautiful" – 3:14

Digital download and streaming – Billen Ted remix
"Kiss My (Uh-Oh)" (Billen Ted remix) – 2:45

Digital download and streaming – Girl Power remix
"Kiss My (Uh-Oh)" (Girl Power remix) (featuring Becky Hill, Raye and Stefflon Don) - 4:36

Credits and personnel
Credits adapted from Tidal.
 Anne-Marie – vocals, songwriting
 Little Mix – vocals
 Pete Nappi – songwriting, production, engineering, programming, guitar, keyboards
 Mojam – production, programming, sound effects, bass, drums, guitar, percussion, synthesizer
 Jacob Banfield – songwriting
 Kamille – songwriting
 Steven "Lenky" Marsden – songwriting
 Upsahl – songwriting
 Lewis Thompson – additional production, keyboards
 Cameron Poole – vocal production
 Raphaella – vocal production
 Stuart Hawkes – mastering
 Phil Tan – mixing
 Bill Zimmerman – assistant mixing
 Paul Norris – engineering

Charts

Certifications

Release history

References

Songs about kissing
2021 singles
2021 songs
Anne-Marie (singer) songs
Little Mix songs
Becky Hill songs
Raye (singer) songs
Stefflon Don songs
Asylum Records singles
Music videos directed by Hannah Lux Davis
Songs written by Kamille (musician)